Richard Ray Taylor (November 21, 1922 – November 8, 1978) was a lieutenant general in the United States military and served as the 33rd Surgeon General of the United States Army.

Biography

Early life and education
Born on November 21, 1922 in Prairieburg, Iowa. He was raised in the small town of Norton, Kansas.  His father and two of his four brothers were physicians.  His father, Charles Fletcher Taylor, MD was the Superintendent of the State Sanitatorium for Tuberculosis, where his brother, David Taylor, MD also served on staff for a time.  His mother, Harriet Taylor, was Kansas mother of the year and was well known for keeping the family together and being a great cook.  Dr. Taylor was one of eight siblings.   His youngest brother, Danny, died in an automobile accident while he was an architecture student at the University of Kansas.  Richard Taylor graduated with a BS from the University of Chicago in 1944 and later from the University of Chicago School of Medicine with his MD in 1946.

Military career
He worked his way up in ranks in the army from First Lieutenant in 1946 to Colonel in 1964, and eventually to Surgeon General of the US Army in October 1973.  He was also in charge of M.A.S.H. units in Vietnam.

Later life
He died on November 8, 1978 at Arlington Hospital (now known as Virginia Hospital Center) in Arlington, Virginia. His first wife died of polio in 1949.  He is survived by his wife, Frances Colby Taylor, his daughter, Carolyn Jean, and his four sons, Richard Ray Jr., Colby Fletcher, Bryan Dudley, and David Webster.

Recognition

Lieutenant General Richard R. Taylor's ribbon bar:

References

United States Army generals
Surgeons General of the United States Army
Recipients of the Distinguished Service Medal (US Army)
Recipients of the Legion of Merit
Recipients of the Distinguished Service Order (Vietnam)
People from Cedar Rapids, Iowa
1922 births
1978 deaths
University of Chicago alumni
20th-century American physicians
Pritzker School of Medicine alumni
Burials at Arlington National Cemetery
Military personnel from Iowa